Rebeca Minguela is a Spanish entrepreneur
 and startup advisor. She was the founder and CEO of Blink Booking, now Blink by Groupon, an award-winning  mobile app to book hotels last minute in Europe. When Blink was acquired by Groupon in September 2013, she joined Groupon.

Minguela is co-founder of Global Impact Rating, a startup selected for the Harvard Innovation Labs - iLab (Harvard Business School Incubator) in 2015.

She was selected Young Global Leader of the World Economic Forum in March 2017.

Blink Booking 
In 2011, Minguela started Blink Booking, a mobile travel app to book hotels last minute in Europe. Blink Booking was the first startup of a platform aimed at fostering entrepreneurship in Spain. She joined Blink as full-time CEO in March 2012 due to an issue with her co-founder and to be able to manage the rapid growth of the company (as stated in Harvard Business School case about Blink Booking).

Blink Booking attracted investment from tech and travel investors (SoftTech VC, ProFounders – Brent Hoberman, Charles Petruccelli and American Express Travel (UVET Italy), Radisson Hotels, Kibo ventures and others). The Blink app was available in six languages, Android, iOS / iPhone and HTML5 in eight different European countries.

Blink Booking was advertised in Spanish and Italian TV, and the TV advert "The Lady in White" received the Sol de Bronce award in 2013 (Festival Iberoamericano de Publicidad, FIAP).

In September 2013, Blink Booking was acquired by Groupon to strengthen its travel and mobile business. Blink Booking is now "Blink by Groupon", and Minguela started then working for Groupon.

Public speaking, press and awards 

Minguela and Blink Booking (the company she started and managed) have been mentioned in the press in several countries, with features in publications including Forbes, The Economist, Financial Times,  El País, El Mundo, Il Sole 24 Ore, and many others. Minguela's entrepreneurship platform and Blink Booking are also the subject of a business case at Harvard Business School.

Minguela has been a speaker at several events and conferences, including the Harvard European Conference 2015, sharing the panel with the Director General for the European Commission; Spain Tech Week Silicon Valley/ Seattle 2014; Startup Spain 3.0; and Red Innova 2013.

Blink has been a top-rated app by Apple Store and Google Play in several countries. It was awarded "Travel Pioneer of the Year 2012" (Travolution Awards, from Travel Weekly) and "Travel App of the Week" by Female First, and it was a finalist of the fifth edition of the Open Talent Award 2013 to most innovative start-ups. Blink Booking TV advert "The Lady in White" was awarded the Sol de Bronce in 2013 (Festival Iberoamericano de Publicidad, FIAP).

Minguela was named female role model entrepreneur in Spain by El Referente'' in April 2016.

References

External links 
 http://blinkbooking.com/
 http://www.blinkbygroupon.com/
 https://hbr.org/product/Blink-Booking/an/813121-PDF-ENG

Spanish businesspeople
Living people
Harvard University alumni
Year of birth missing (living people)